Hitendra Kanaiyalal Desai (9 August 1915 – 12 September 1993) was an Indian politician who served as the 3rd Chief Minister of Gujarat from 1965 to 1971  and a leader of Indian National Congress and later Indian National Congress.

Political career
Desai was born in Surat In a Gujarati Nagar Brahmin family. As a student, he took leading part in debates, sports and other activities at School and College. In 1941-42, he was arrested during the ‘Quit India’ freedom Movement for offering individual Satyagrah and went  to jail for one year. He was Education Minister in the reorganised Bombay state.

Hitendra Desai was the Minister of Law in the ministry headed by Dr. Jivraj Narayan Mehta.  He was also Minister for Home and Deputy leader of the House. Later, he was the Chief Minister of the state from 20 September 1965 to 12 May 1971. He decided to side with the syndicate after the expulsion of Indira Gandhi from the Congress. The 1969 Gujarat riots occurred during his administration.

Notes

External links
Official biographical sketch in Parliament of India website

1915 births
1993 deaths
Chief Ministers of Gujarat
People from Surat
Gujarat MLAs 1967–1971
Chief ministers from Indian National Congress (Organisation)
Indian National Congress (Organisation) politicians
India MPs 1977–1979
Lok Sabha members from Gujarat
Commerce and Industry Ministers of India
Janata Party (Secular) politicians
Janata Party politicians
Indian National Congress politicians from Gujarat